Cheadle and Gatley is an electoral ward in the Metropolitan Borough of Stockport. It elects three Councillors to Stockport Metropolitan Borough Council using the first past the post electoral method, electing one Councillor every year without election on the fourth.

Together with Bramhall North, Bramhall South, Cheadle Hulme North, Cheadle Hulme South, Heald Green and Stepping Hill Wards it makes up the Cheadle Parliamentary Constituency.
The ward contains the Cheadle College, which is part of the Cheadle and Marple Sixth Form College.

Councillors 
Cheadle and Gatley electoral ward is represented in Westminster by Mary Robinson MP for Cheadle.

The ward is represented on Stockport Council by three councillors:

 Ian Hunter (Lib Dem)
 Graham Greenhalgh (Lib Dem)
 Keith Holloway (Lib Dem)

 indicates seat up for re-election.
 indicates seat won in by-election.

Elections in 2010s

May 2019

May 2018

May 2016

May 2015

May 2014

May 2012

May 2011

References

External links
Stockport Metropolitan Borough Council

Wards of the Metropolitan Borough of Stockport
Cheadle, Greater Manchester